Khagapati Pradhani (1922-2010) was an Indian politician belonging to the Indian National Congress and he was elected 9 times to the Lower House of the Indian Parliament the Lok Sabha in 1967,1971,1977,1980,1984,1989,1991,1996 and 1998 from Nowrangpur constituency of Odisha.

References

External links
  Official biographical sketch in Parliament of India website

1922 births
Lok Sabha members from Odisha
India MPs 1967–1970
India MPs 1971–1977
India MPs 1977–1979
India MPs 1980–1984
India MPs 1984–1989
India MPs 1989–1991
India MPs 1991–1996
India MPs 1996–1997
India MPs 1998–1999
2010 deaths
People from Nabarangpur district
People from Koraput
Indian National Congress politicians from Odisha